Inauguration of Joko Widodo may refer to:

 First inauguration of Joko Widodo, 2014
 Second inauguration of Joko Widodo, 2019